José Bladas Torras (born July 23, 1957 in Terrassa) is a Spanish sport shooter. He competed at the Summer Olympics in 1988 and 1992. In 1988, he tied for 18th place in the mixed trap event, and in 1992, he placed seventh in the mixed trap event.

References

1957 births
Living people
Trap and double trap shooters
Spanish male sport shooters
Shooters at the 1988 Summer Olympics
Shooters at the 1992 Summer Olympics
Olympic shooters of Spain
20th-century Spanish people